Stevo Bednarsky (born August 8, 1998) is an American soccer player who plays for New York City FC II in the MLS Next Pro.

Playing career

Youth
At the youth level, Stevo Bednarsky played for local club Stronghold SC in New Jersey, a club which his parents helped to organise.

College
Bednarsky attended Lehigh University in Pennsylvania for five years, between 2017 and 2022, majoring in Arts and Science. In five seasons he played 57 matches, scoring twice. On three occasions he was selected in an All-Patriot League team, and on one occasion was recognised at All-Atlantic Region level.

Senior
In 2018, Bednarsky signed on to appear for Premier Development League side Lehigh Valley United. He played nine times for them in 2018 before signing on for a second season in which he would play ten matches and score twice. In 2021 he returned to the USL and played four games for FC Motown.

On March 24, 2022, Bednarsky was announced as an inaugural season signing for MLS Next Pro club New York City FC II, signing his first full professional contract. His competitive debut came in a loss on penalties to Orlando City B on April 3.

Career statistics
.

References 

1998 births
American soccer players
Association football midfielders
Living people
Lehigh Mountain Hawks men's soccer players
Lehigh Valley United players
New York City FC II players
MLS Next Pro players